Muhammad ibn Abd al-Rahman al-Gashtuli al-Jurjuri al-Azhari Abu Qabrayn (died in 1793/1794), mostly known as Sidi M'hamed Bou Qobrine was a Berber ash'ari 'alim, founder of the Rahmaniyya Sufi order and is one of the seven Patron Saints of Algiers. The Sidi M'Hamed District in Algiers and the municipality of the same name, Sidi M'Hamed, are both named after him.

Biography 

Muhammad was born to the Berber Ayt Smail tribe of the Gashtula tribal confederation in the Djurdjura, Kabylie. After studying at his home, he went to Algiers to continue his studies. In 1740, he went to make the pilgrimage to Mecca. Returning from the pilgrimage, he stayed in Cairo, where he studied in the Al-Azhar madrasa. It was in this madrasa that he was initiated to the Khalwatiyya order under his teacher Muhammad ibn Salim al-Hafnawi. Under his teacher's orders, Muhammad started propagating the tariqa to India and the Sudan. After thirty years, he returned to Algeria, where he started preaching it among his people and founded a zawiya in his natal village. 

He died in 1793/1794.

See also 
 Sidi M'hamed Bou Qobrine Cemetery
 List of Sufis
 List of Sufi saints
 Algerian Islamic reference

References

Muftis of Algiers
18th-century Berber people
Algerian Sufi saints
Asharism in Algeria
People from Boghni
1793 deaths
Kabyle people
Year of birth unknown
18th-century Algerian people
Algerian Sufis
M
Asharis
Sunni Sufis
Rahmaniyya